József Doncsecz (born 16 January 1950) is a Hungarian wrestler. He competed at the 1972 Summer Olympics and the 1976 Summer Olympics.

References

External links
 

1950 births
Living people
Hungarian male sport wrestlers
Olympic wrestlers of Hungary
Wrestlers at the 1972 Summer Olympics
Wrestlers at the 1976 Summer Olympics
People from Szentgotthárd
Sportspeople from Vas County